Krister Malm (born 1941) is a Swedish musicologist.

Malm has in his research been engaged in music ethnology and finished his doctorate in 1981 at the University of Gothenburg with a dissertation on the music culture of the Tanzania. From 1973 to 1983, he was head of Stockholm Music Museum and between 1999 and 2005 head of the National Collections of Music. Malm was elected as a member of the Royal Swedish Academy of Music in 1996. He is active in the International Council for Traditional Music, serving as a member of the executive board from 1983 to 1993, vice president from 1995 to 1999, and president from 1999-2005. In 2007, he was awarded the Fumio Koizumi Prize for Ethnomusicology.

He is best known for his work investigating how local music industries shape music, especially in Big sounds from small peoples: the music industry in small countries, co-written with Roger Wallis.

Bibliography

References

External links
 Official site

Swedish musicologists
1941 births
Living people